Carahsoft, legally Carahsoft Technology Corp., founded in 2004, is a privately held business located in Reston, VA that sells IT hardware, software and consulting services to federal, state and local governments, and educational institutions.

Business model 
Carahsoft sells IT hardware, software and consulting services related to data analysis and storage, cyber defense and security, business intelligence, and other corporate and government functions.

Author Mark Amtower categorized Carahsoft as a “boutique reseller” because the company “sells a limited number of products, usually those that address a specific need in the market.” The company supports more than 3,000 prime contractors, value-added re-sellers, system integrators and other channel partners.

Contracts

U.S. Department of Defense 
The U.S. Department of Defense is one of Carahsoft’s largest customers.

2020 
On April 2, 2020, Naval Information Warfare Systems Command contracted Carahsoft for a variety of BlackBerry services. On May 22, 2020, the U.S. Air Force awarded Carahsoft an $81 million contract to help the Space Command and Control Division within Space & Missile Systems Center (Los Angeles Air Force Base) create and implement software development and information technology operations. On July 16, 2020, Carahsoft was awarded roughly $29.8 million to work at Fort Belvoir, moving an Army logistics modernization program to the cloud. On July 27, 2020, the U.S. Army awarded Carahsoft a $16 million contract to support the Army Enterprise Systems Integration Program and Global Combat Support System. On August 31, the DoD included Carahsoft in a 10-year, $13 billion firm-fixed-price contract with 30 other tech companies to supply off-the-shelf enterprise infrastructure software and maintenance to the U.S. Army, Department of Defense and all federal agencies.

2019 
The U.S. Navy included Carahsoft on a 10-year, $975 million blanket purchase agreement to provide SAP software products, a five-year $69.1 million BPA to provide Symantec software licenses, and a four-year $440 million BPA to provide McAfee hardware, software and services. Carahsoft was awarded a basic ordering agreement from the U.S Army to support a transition to cloud computing environments, for an estimated cost of $247.7 million. The DoD also included Carahsoft on an $820,450,000 BPA to supply information technology asset management software, software maintenance support, information technology professional services; and related services to the DoD, intelligence community and U.S. Coast Guard.

2018 
The DoD awarded an estimated $131,000,866 in contracts to Carahsoft as of June 2018.

2017 
The DoD awarded an estimated $270,475,338 in contracts to Carahsoft in 2017.

2016 
The DoD awarded an estimated $80,075,312 in contracts to Carahsoft in 2016.

U.S. General Services Administration

2019 
Carahsoft was one of 11 teams selected by the U.S. GSA and National Geospatial-Intelligence Agency (NGA) as part of a blanket purchase agreement (BPA) to provide geospatial earth observation data, products and services. Carahsoft and Grant Thornton were given multi-million dollar task orders as part of a blanket purchase agreement related to NewPay, a U.S. General Services Administration initiative to modernize federal payroll IT and services.

2018 
Carahsoft was one of two teams selected by the U.S. GSA as part of a 10-year, $2.5 billion blanket purchase agreement to provide Software-as-a-Service (SaaS) applications for payroll, work schedule and leave management.

Overcharging allegations and settlement 
In 2010 a lawsuit was filed against Carahsoft and VMware for allegedly overcharging government customers. The firms denied the allegations. To avoid protracted litigation, they settled the case with the United States Department of Justice for $75.5m.

References 

Technology companies of the United States
Companies based in Reston, Virginia
Technology companies established in 2004
American companies established in 2004
2004 establishments in Virginia
Privately held companies based in Virginia